Protein kinase, interferon-inducible double stranded RNA dependent activator, also known as interferon-inducible double stranded RNA-dependent protein kinase activator A or  Protein ACTivator of the interferon-induced protein kinase (PACT) is a protein that in humans is encoded by the PRKRA gene. PACT heterodimerizes with and activates protein kinase R.
PRKRA mutations have been linked to a rare form of dystonia parkinsonism.

References

Further reading